Bjarne Aagaard Pedersen (born 12 July 1978 in Holstebro, Denmark) is a former international motorcycle speedway rider who represented Denmark in the Speedway World Cup, winning it on two occasions: in 2006 and 2008.

Career summary
Pedersen began his speedway career in 1990. He won his first title in 1994 winning a Danish junior pairs championship with Charlie Gjedde. However, he did not ride as a full-time professional until 2000. Pedersen began his UK racing career with the Newcastle Diamonds in the Premier League. He took part in his first two Speedway Grand Prix events in 2002, both as a wild card. His first full Speedway Grand Prix season came in 2003, but it was not until 2004 when Pedersen won his only Grand Prix to date at the European GP in Wrocław. In 2004 he also won the Elite League Riders' Championship.

Pedersen admitted at the end of the 2007 season that he had lost enthusiasm for riding in Speedway Grand Prix series until he qualified for the 2008 series in the race off in Vojens.

Pedersen was retained by Poole for the 2008 season over former world champion Jason Crump when it was announced the British Speedway Promoters' Association (BSPA) that the points limit for team building purposes was to be reduced drastically. Poole promoter Matt Ford stated that Pedersen was chosen due to his loyalty to Poole over the previous six seasons. He continued to ride for Poole until the end of the 2010 season when he joined Eastbourne Eagles for the 2011 Elite League speedway season.

On 20 August 2011, he qualified for the 2012 Speedway Grand Prix as a permanent rider, after finishing runner-up in the GP Challenge. After one season with Birmingham Brummies he returned to Eastbourne for the 2013 and 2014 seasons.

Following a few rides for Leicester Lions in 2015 he rejoined Poole for the 2016 Elite League campaign. 

In 2021, he signed for Peterborough Panthers and Plymouth Gladiators and after winning the league and cup double with Peterborough during the SGB Premiership 2021 season, he announced his retirement.

Speedway Grand Prix results

* Pedersen sustained a broken wrist during a Craven Shield meeting for Poole on 2 May 2008. His place at the European Grand Prix and the Swedish Grand Prix were taken by first reserve Lubos Tomicek.

References

1978 births
Living people
Danish speedway riders
Speedway World Cup champions
Birmingham Brummies riders
Eastbourne Eagles riders
Leicester Lions riders
Newcastle Diamonds riders
Peterborough Panthers riders
Plymouth Gladiators speedway riders
Poole Pirates riders
People from Holstebro
Sportspeople from the Central Denmark Region